The Brotherhood of Russian Truth was a Russian counter-revolutionary nationalist organization established in 1921 by Pyotr Krasnov and other former members of the White movement, including Prince Anatol von Lieven, to overthrow Bolshevism in Soviet Russia. The term "Russian Truth" is the word used to describe the Russian code of laws established by the mediaeval Rus' Grand Prince, Yaroslav I the Wise.  The political program of the Brotherhood was anti-communism with a monarchist, Orthodox Christian sentiment.

The main method of struggle for the Brotherhood was the establishment of an underground network of counter-revolutionaries within Soviet Russia. The Brotherhood sent agents to cross the Soviet border illegally, as did the Russian All-Military Union and the NTS. Unfortunately for the Brotherhood, agents working for the Inner Line disrupted their activities, causing considerable casualties.

The organization ceased its activity after its president Afinogen Argunov was killed in 1932 by a GPU agent.

References
 M.V. Nazarov, The Mission of the Russian Emigration, Moscow: Rodnik, 1994. 
 Будницкий О. В. Братство Русской Правды — последний литературный проект С. А. Соколова-Кречетова // Новое литературное обозрение. 2003. — № 64 (6). — С. 114—143
 Седунов А. В. «Белые террористы» на Северо-Западе Россив в 1920—1930-е годы // Псков : Научно-практический и историко-краеведческий журнал. — 2012. — Т. 36. — С. 157—171.
 Базанов П. Н. Братство русской правды: самая загадочная организация Русского Зарубежья. — Посев. — М., 2013. — 430 с. — ISBN 9785990282087.
 Антропов О. К. Эмигрантская террористическая организация «Братство русской правды» в 1920—1930-х годах // Перекрестки истории. Актуальные проблемы исторической науки. Материалы IX Всероссийской научной конференции. Ответственный редактор и составитель: Д. В. Васильев, А. В. Сызранов. 2013. — С. 21-27.
 Анашкин Д. П. Братство русской правды : По материалам фонда Ларина из архива Свято-Троицкой духовной семинарии в Джорданвилле // Ежегодная Богословская конференция Православного Свято-Тихоновского Гуманитарного Университета: Материалы. XXVI / гл. ред. В. Н. Воробьев, прот. — М. : ПСТГУ, 2016. — 356 с. — С. 121—127

White Russian emigration
Russian counter-revolutionaries
Anti-communism in Russia
Anti-communist organizations
1921 establishments in France
Organizations established in 1921
Organizations disestablished in 1932